Chatturat is a district (amphoe) of Chaiyaphum province, northeastern Thailand.

History
Phraya Narin Songkhram (Thongkham) led people from Vientiane to establish a new town at Mueang Narai, in the modern-day tambon Cho Ho, Mueang Nakhon Ratchasima district. Later they moved to a fertile square pond, settled there, and named the new town Ban Si Mum. Now it is Ban Sa Si Mum, tambon Ban Kok, in the modern-day district. In 1826 Phraya Narin Songkhram moved the center of the town northwards to tambon Nong Bua Yai, around 8 km from the old town. When he died, his son, Saek, travelled to Bangkok to receive the royal command documents for his appointment as governor. However he died on the way to Bangkok, so Mr. Bun Hao received the royal command instead. After that he moved the center of town to the southwest at tambon Ban Kok because the old location was prone to flooding. When Phraya Narin Songkhram (Bun Hao) died, his son Thongdi received the royal command to be the governor.

Geography
Neighboring districts are (from the north clockwise): Ban Khwao, Noen Sa-nga of Chaiyaphum Province; Phra Thong Kham and Dan Khun Thot of Nakhon Ratchasima province; and Bamnet Narong, Sap Yai, and Nong Bua Rawe of Chaiyaphum Province.

Administration
The district is divided into nine sub-districts (tambons), which are further subdivided into 115 villages (mubans). Nong Bua Khok has township (thesaban tambon) status.

Missing numbers are tambons which now form Noen Sa-nga district and Sap Yai district

Chatturat